Federico Fattori Mouzo (born 22 July 1992) is an Argentine professional footballer who plays as a central midfielder for Huracán, on loan from Ferro Carril Oeste.

Career
Fattori's career started in 2013 with Nueva Chicago in Primera B Metropolitana, his career debut versus Deportivo Merlo on 2 November was the first of fourteen appearances during the 2013–14 season which Nueva Chicago ended as champions. He scored his first goal in Primera B Nacional in October 2014 against Aldosivi. On 29 January 2015, Fattori signed for Newell's Old Boys of the Primera División. Six appearances followed, prior to Fattori returning to Nueva Chicago on loan in January 2016. He remained for two seasons and scored once in fifty-four matches. On 31 July 2017, Fattori rejoined permanently.

He scored on his second full-time debut for Nueva Chicago on 17 September, in a 1–1 draw with Independiente Rivadavia in Primera B Nacional. Six months after rejoining Nueva Chicago, Fattori left in January 2018 to play for Primera División side Temperley. He made eleven appearances, was sent off in his ninth, as they suffered relegation. He remained with them in the second tier for three more seasons, appearing forty-three times and scoring once; versus Estudiantes on 21 September 2019. On 25 February 2021, Fattori was signed by Primera Nacional counterparts Ferro Carril Oeste.

Career statistics
.

Honours
Nueva Chicago
Primera B Metropolitana: 2013–14

References

External links

1992 births
Living people
Footballers from Buenos Aires
Argentine footballers
Association football midfielders
Primera B Metropolitana players
Primera Nacional players
Argentine Primera División players
Nueva Chicago footballers
Newell's Old Boys footballers
Club Atlético Temperley footballers
Ferro Carril Oeste footballers
Club Atlético Huracán footballers